This is a list of the highest mountains of Switzerland. This list only includes summits above  with a topographic prominence of at least 30 metres. Note that this list includes many secondary summits that are typically not considered mountains (in the strict sense of the term) but that are mainly of climbing interest. For a list of major summits only, without elevation cut-off, see List of mountains of Switzerland.

The International Climbing and Mountaineering Federation defines a summit in the Alps as independent, if the connecting ridge between it and a higher summit drops at least 30 m (a prominence/drop of 30 m, with the lowest point referred to as the "key col"). There are over 250 such summits exceeding 3,600 m in Switzerland, all located in the High Alps, in five cantons: Valais, Bern, Graubünden, Uri, and Glarus. All mountain heights and prominences on the list are from the largest-scale maps available.

List

See also
List of mountain lakes of Switzerland - highest lakes of Switzerland
List of mountain railways in Switzerland - highest railways in Switzerland
List of highest paved roads in Switzerland

Notes

References

 
Switzerland